Barbara Magnolfi (born 16 April 1955)  is a Franco-Italian actress. She appeared in more than sixteen films since 1969.

Selected filmography

References

External links 

1955 births
Living people
Actors from Rennes
Italian film actresses